Live at Monsters of Rock is a live album and DVD Northern Irish blues guitarist and singer Gary Moore. It was recorded live on May 21, 2003 at Sheffield Hallam Arena in England, during Gary Moore's appearance on the 2003 Monsters of Rock tour. Despite being credited solely to Moore, the album actually represents a performance by Moore's short-lived Scars project, featuring Cass Lewis and Darrin Mooney on bass and drums, respectively. The band plays several tracks from their only studio album, released the previous year, as well as songs from Moore's extensive back catalogue.

The DVD, released in 2003 by Sanctuary Visual Entertainment, contains no overdubs and includes a bonus sound check and bonus interview footage of Gary Moore.

Performances

Personnel 
 Gary Moore - lead vocals, guitar, mixing, producer
 Cass Lewis - bass guitar, backing vocals
 Darrin Mooney - drums
 Chris Tsangarides - engineer, mixing, producer
 Will Shapland - engineer
 Ian Cooper - mastering

References

Albums produced by Chris Tsangarides
Gary Moore live albums
2003 video albums
2003 live albums
Sanctuary Records live albums
Live video albums
Sanctuary Records video albums